Kate Foster may refer to:
 Kate Foster (snowboarder)
 Kate Foster (diplomat)

See also
 Kat Foster, American actress